The Museum of Northwest Colorado, located in Craig, Colorado, was established in 1964 as the Moffat County Museum to house artifacts and preserve legends of the Old West.

The museum features a large, nationally recognized cowboy gear collection, that includes rare Winchesters, Colts, chaps, spurs, saddles, gun leather, and other artifacts.  The Moffat Road Railroad Display features photos and memorabilia about the Denver, Northwestern & Pacific Railway, founded by David Moffat.  Other exhibits include American outlaw Harry Tracy and includes his actual gun rig, Ann Basset along with her original spurs, African American cowboy Isam Dart who was murdered by Tom Horn etc.  Also included are displays regarding mining, ranching and pioneer artifacts, rocks and fossils including a large dinosaur footprint and bones, and period historic room displays.

State Armory building

Originally housed in the Moffat County Courthouse, the museum opened in the former Colorado State Armory in 1991. The building, at 590 Yampa Ave. in Craig, was built in 1922 and was listed on the National Register of Historic Places in 1992 as State Armory.  It was designed by architect John J. Huddart.

References

External links
Museum of Northwest Colorado - official site

American West museums in Colorado
History museums in Colorado
Museums in Moffat County, Colorado
National Register of Historic Places in Moffat County, Colorado
Buildings and structures completed in 1922
Armories in Colorado